Kulovesi is a medium-sized lake in Finland. It is situated in the area of the towns Nokia and Sastamala in the Pirkanmaa region. The lake is part of the Kokemäenjoki basin. The lake Pyhäjärvi drains through the Nokianvirta River into the Lake Kulovesi from the west and the lake Kyrösjärvi through a chain of lakes (last one being Mahnalanselkä – Kirkkojärvi) and the Siuronkoski rapids from the north near the Siuro village. The lake gathers waters from an area of 20 822 km² that includes the whole upper part of the Kokemäenjoki basin. Lake Kulovesi drains into the lake Rautavesi which in its turn drains into the lake Liekovesi and this finally into the Kokemäenjoki River.

See also
List of lakes in Finland

References

Kokemäenjoki basin
Nokia, Finland
Landforms of Pirkanmaa
Lakes of Sastamala